Expo This Week was a Canadian news television series which aired on CBC Television in 1967.

Premise
This series provided weekly reports during Expo 67, the World's Fair in Montreal. Besides news of the past week's activities, episodes featured interviews with visitors and celebrities and reports on Expo venues.

Peter Reilly hosted the series until he left and was replaced by Lloyd Robertson in  September. Chantal Beauregard was added as co-host from July.

Production
The CBC's international broadcast centre at Expo 67 was budgeted at $10 million. The series was produced in colour, using technologically advanced portable video equipment for location reports.

Jim Guthro initially produced the series with assistance from David Pears. From July, Guthro was replaced by Peter Elkington who was first assisted by Wilfred Haydon, then from September by Bill Bolt.

Series sponsor was Shell Canada, supplemented by Chrysler Canada during the first six weeks.

Scheduling
This half-hour series was broadcast Tuesdays at 9:00 p.m. (Eastern) from 2 May to 17 October 1967.

See also
Pavilion (TV series), another CBC TV series on Expo 67.

References

External links
 

CBC Television original programming
1967 Canadian television series debuts
1967 Canadian television series endings
Expo 67